Solrød Strand is a Danish town, seat of the Solrød Municipality, in the Region Sjælland. It is commonly known simply as Solrød. Its population as of 1 January 2022 was 17,337 including Jersie Strand, the southern part of the Solrød Strand urban area.

History

Geography
Solrød Strand is located in the eastern side of the Zealand island about 30 kilometer southwest of Copenhagen.

Notable people 

 Peter Lundin (born 1972 in Solrød Strand) a Dane convicted of four counts of murder, in the US and Denmark
 Simon Sears (born 1984), actor, raised in Solrød Strand

Sport 
 Rikke Olsen (born 1975) is a retired badminton player, lives in Solrød Strand
 Ken Ilsø (born 1986 in Solrød Strand) a former Danish professional footballer with 250 club caps
 Joachim Andersen (born 1996 in Solrød Strand) a Danish professional footballer with over 130 club caps
 Mia Blichfeldt (born 1997 in Solrød Strand) a Danish badminton player, still lives in Solrød Strand

See also
Solrød Strand station

References

External links

Municipal seats of Region Zealand
Municipal seats of Denmark
Copenhagen metropolitan area
Cities and towns in Region Zealand
Solrød Municipality